Brief Encounter is a 1945 British romantic drama film directed by David Lean from a screenplay by Noël Coward, based on his 1936 one-act play Still Life.

Starring Celia Johnson, Trevor Howard, Stanley Holloway, and Joyce Carey, it follows a passionate extramarital affair in England shortly before World War II. The protagonist is Laura, a married woman with children, whose conventional life becomes increasingly complicated after a chance meeting at a railway station with a married stranger with whom she subsequently falls in love.

The film premiered in London on 13 November 1945, and was theatrically released on 25 November to widespread critical acclaim. It received three nominations at the 19th Academy Awards, Best Director, Best Actress (for Johnson), and Best Adapted Screenplay.

Many critics, historians, and scholars cite the film as one of the greatest of all time. In 1999, the British Film Institute ranked it as the second-greatest British film of all time. In 2017, a Time Out poll of 150 actors, directors, writers, producers, and critics ranked it the 12th-best British film ever.

Plot
Laura Jesson, a respectable middle-class British woman in an affectionate but rather dull marriage, tells her story while sitting at home with her husband, imagining that she is confessing her affair to him.

Like many women of her class at the time, Laura visits a nearby town every Thursday for shopping and a matinée movie. Returning from one such excursion to Milford, while waiting in the railway station's refreshment room, she is helped by another passenger, who solicitously removes a piece of grit from her eye. The man is Alec Harvey, an idealistic general practitioner who also works Thursdays as a consultant at the local hospital. Both are in their late thirties or early forties, married, and with children (although Alec's wife Madeleine and their two sons are unseen).

The two accidentally meet again outside Boots the Chemist, and then on a third meeting share a table at lunch, then, both having free time, go to an afternoon performance at the Palladium Cinema. They are soon troubled to find their innocent and casual relationship developing into something deeper, approaching infidelity.

They meet openly until they run into friends of Laura's and the perceived need to deceive others arises. The second lie comes more easily. They eventually go to a flat belonging to Stephen, a friend of Alec's and a fellow doctor, but are interrupted by Stephen's unexpected and judgmental return. Humiliated and ashamed, Laura runs down the back stairs and into the streets. She walks and walks, and sits on a bench for hours, smoking, until a concerned policeman encourages her to get out of the cold. She arrives at the station just in time for the last train home.

The recent turn of events makes the couple realise that an affair or a future together is impossible. Understanding the temptation and not wishing to hurt their families, they agree to part. Alec has been offered a job in Johannesburg, South Africa, where his brother lives.

Their final meeting occurs in the railway station refreshment room, now seen for a second time with the poignant perspective of their story. As they await a heart-rending final parting, Dolly Messiter, a talkative acquaintance of Laura's, invites herself to join them and begins chattering away, oblivious to the couple's misery.

As they realise that they have lost their chance for a final goodbye, Alec's train arrives. With Dolly still chattering, Alec departs without the passionate farewell for which they both long. After shaking Dolly's hand, he discreetly squeezes Laura on the shoulder and leaves. Laura waits for a moment, anxiously hoping that Alec will walk back into the refreshment room, but he does not. As the train is heard pulling away, Laura is galvanised by emotion, and, hearing an approaching express train, dashes out to the platform. The train's lights flash across her face as she conquers a suicidal impulse. She then returns home to her family.

Laura's kind and patient husband, Fred, shows that he has noticed her distance, though whether he has guessed the reason is not clear. He thanks her for coming back to him. She cries in his embrace.

Cast

Adaptation

Still Life
The film is based on Noël Coward's one-act play Still Life (1936), one of ten short plays in the cycle Tonight at 8.30, designed for Gertrude Lawrence and Coward himself, and to be performed in various combinations as triple bills. All scenes in Still Life are set in the refreshment room of a railway station (the fictional Milford Junction).

As is common in films based on stage plays, the film depicts only places mentioned in the play: Dr. Lynn's flat, Laura's home, a cinema, a restaurant and a branch of Boots the Chemist. There are also several scenes that are not in the play: a scene on a lake in a rowing boat where Dr Harvey gets his feet wet; Laura wandering alone in the dark, sitting down on a park bench, smoking in public and being confronted by a police officer; and a drive in the country in a hired car.

Some scenes are made less ambiguous and more dramatic in the film. The scene in which the two lovers are about to commit adultery is toned down: in the play it is left for the audience to decide whether they actually consummate their relationship; in the film it seems that they do not. In the film, Laura has only just arrived at Dr Lynn's flat when the owner returns and is immediately led out by Dr Harvey via the kitchen service door. Later, when Laura seems to want to throw herself in front of an express train, the film makes the intention clearer by means of voice-over narration.

Also, in the play, the characters at the Milford station—Mrs Baggot, Mr Godby, Beryl and Stanley—are very much aware of the growing relationship between Laura and Alec, and sometimes mention it in an offhand manner; in the film, they take barely any notice of them or what they are doing. The final scene of the film, showing Laura embracing her husband after he shows that he has noticed her distance in the past few weeks and perhaps even guessed the reason, is not in the original Coward play.

There are two editions of Coward's original screenplay for the film adaptation, both listed in the bibliography.

Production
Much of the film version was shot at Carnforth railway station in Lancashire, then a junction on the London, Midland and Scottish Railway. While a busy station, it was far enough away from major cities to avoid the blackout for film purposes, shooting taking place in early 1945 before World War II had ended. At two points in the film, the station location is indicated by platform signs referring to local destinations including Leeds, Bradford, Morecambe and Lancaster. Coward makes the station announcements in the film. The station refreshment room was a studio recreation. Carnforth Station still retains many of the period features present at the time of filming and remains a place of pilgrimage for fans of the film. Some of the urban scenes were shot in London, Denham, and Beaconsfield, near Denham Studios, where the film was made.

The country bridge the lovers visit twice (including on their final day) is Middle Fell Bridge at Dungeon Ghyll in Cumbria.

The poem that Fred asks Laura to assist him with for his crossword is by John Keats: "When I have Fears that I may Cease to Be". The quote Fred recites is "When I behold, upon the night's starr'd face, huge cloudy symbols of a high romance".

In addition to the Keats reference, there is a visual reference to an Arabic love poem. In Dr Lynn's apartment, a wall hanging is prominently displayed twice. When Laura enters, there is a shot of it over the dining table. Later, when Stephen confronts Alec, it is seen over Alec's left shoulder.

Music
Excerpts from Sergei Rachmaninoff's Piano Concerto No. 2 recur throughout the film, played by the National Symphony Orchestra, conducted by Muir Mathieson with pianist Eileen Joyce. There is also a scene in a tearoom where a salon orchestra plays Spanish Dance No. 5 (Bolero) by Moritz Moszkowski.

Release

Box office
According to trade papers, the film was a "notable box office attraction". It was the 21st most popular film at the British box office in 1946. According to Kinematograph Weekly the 'biggest winner' at the box office in 1946 Britain was The Wicked Lady, with "runners up" being The Bells of St Marys, Piccadilly Incident, The Road to Utopia, Tomorrow is Forever, Brief Encounter, Wonder Man, Anchors Away, Kitty, The Captive Heart, The Corn is Green, Spanish Main, Leave Her to Heaven, Gilda, Caravan, Mildred Pierce, Blue Dahlia, Years Between, O.S.S., Spellbound, Courage of Lassie, My Reputation, London Town, Caesar and Cleopatra, Meet the Navy, Men of Two Worlds, Theirs is the Glory, The Overlanders, and Bedelia.

Critical reception
Brief Encounter was acclaimed upon its release, although there were doubts that it would be "generally popular". It was voted one of the 10 greatest films ever made in two separate 1952 critics' polls. The film was a great success in the UK and such a hit in the US that Celia Johnson was nominated for an Academy Award for Best Actress. In 1999 the film was given the #2 slot on the British Film Institute's BFI Top 100 British films.

Today, the film is widely praised for its black-and-white photography and the mood created by the steam-age railway setting, both of which were particular to the original David Lean version. On review aggregator Rotten Tomatoes, the film holds an approval rating of 91% based on 46 reviews, with an average rating of 8.60/10. The website's critical consensus reads: "Brief Encounter adds a small but valuable gem to the Lean filmography, depicting a doomed couple's illicit connection with affecting sensitivity and a pair of powerful performances." On Metacritic, it has a weighted average score of 92 out of 100 based on 16 critics, indicating "universal acclaim".

Awards and nominations

Legacy
In her book Noël Coward (1987), Frances Gray says that Brief Encounter is, after the major comedies, the one work of Coward that almost everybody knows and has probably seen; it has featured frequently on television and its viewing figures are invariably high.  Its story is that of an unconsummated affair between two married people [....] Coward is keeping his lovers in check because he cannot handle the energies of a less inhibited love in a setting shorn of the wit and exotic flavour of his best comedies [....] To look at the script, shorn of David Lean's beautiful camera work, deprived of an audience who would automatically approve of the final sacrifice, is to find oneself asking awkward questions (pp. 64–67).

Brief Encounter holds a 91% "fresh" rating at review aggregator Rotten Tomatoes. In 1999 it came second in a British Film Institute poll of the top 100 British films. In 2004, the magazine Total Film named it the 44th greatest British film of all time. Derek Malcolm included the film in his 2000 column The Century of Films. The British historian Thomas Dixon notes that Brief Encounter "has become a classic example of a very modern and very British phenomenon—weeping over the stiff upper lip, crying at people not crying. The audiences for these wartime weepies could, through their own tears, provide something that was lacking in their own lives as well as those of the on-screen stoics they admired."

The British play and film The History Boys features two of the main characters reciting a passage of the film. (The scene portrayed, with Posner as Johnson and Scripps as Raymond, is in the closing minutes of the film where Laura begins, "I really meant to do it.")

Director Robert Altman's wife Kathryn Altman said, "One day, years and years ago, just after the war, [Altman] had nothing to do and he went to a theater in the middle of the afternoon to see a movie. Not a Hollywood movie: a British movie. He said the main character was not glamorous, not a babe. And at first he wondered why he was even watching it. But twenty minutes later he was in tears, and had fallen in love with her. And it made him feel that it wasn't just a movie." The film was Brief Encounter.

The episode "Grief Encounter" of the British comedy series Goodnight Sweetheart features the Coward character and shooting a similar scene in Milford railway station. Mum's Army, an episode of Dad's Army, also seems loosely inspired by Brief Encounter.

Brief Encounter serves as a plot device in Mrs. Palfrey at the Claremont, a 2005 comedy-drama film based on the 1971 novel by Elizabeth Taylor. The aging widow Mrs. Palfrey reminisces that Brief Encounter was her and her deceased husband's favorite film, which leads her young friend, the writer Ludovic Meyer, to meet and bond with his eventual girlfriend.

In the 2012 Sight & Sound polls of the world's greatest films, Brief Encounter received the votes of 11 critics and three directors.

Social context

Frances Gray acknowledges a common criticism of the play: why do the characters not consummate the affair? Gray argues that their problem is class consciousness: the working classes can act in a vulgar way, and the upper class can be silly; but the middle class is, or at least considers itself, the moral backbone of society—a notion whose validity Coward did not really want to question or jeopardise, as the middle classes were his principal audience.

But in her narration, Laura stresses that what holds her back is her horror at the thought of betraying her husband and her morals, tempted though she is by the force of her feelings. Indeed, this very tension has made the film such an enduring favourite.

The values Laura precariously, but ultimately successfully, clings to were widely shared and respected (if not always observed) at the time of the film's original setting (the status of a divorced woman, for example, remained sufficiently scandalous in the UK to cause Edward VIII to abdicate in 1936). Updating the story might have left those values behind and with them vanished the plot's credibility, which may be why the 1974 remake could not compete.

The film was released amid the social and cultural context of the Second World War, when 'brief encounters' were considered commonplace and women had far greater sexual and economic freedom than before. In British National Cinema (1997), Sarah Street argues that "Brief Encounter thus articulated a range of feelings about infidelity which invited easy identification, whether it involved one's husband, lover, children or country" (p. 55). In this context, feminist critics read the film as an attempt at stabilising relationships to return to the status quo.

In his 1993 BFI book on the film, Richard Dyer notes that owing to the rise of homosexual law reform, gay men also saw the characters' plight as comparable to their own social constraints in forming and maintaining relationships. Sean O'Connor considers the film an "allegorical representation of forbidden love" informed by Coward's experiences as a closeted gay man.

Further adaptations

Radio
Brief Encounter was adapted as a radio play on 20 November 1946 episode of Academy Award Theater, starring Greer Garson. It was presented three times on The Screen Guild Theater, on 12 May 1947 with Herbert Marshall and Lilli Palmer, on 12 January 1948 with Marshall and Irene Dunne, and on 11 January 1951 with Stewart Granger and Deborah Kerr. It was also adapted to Lux Radio Theater on 29 November 1948 with Garson and Van Heflin and on 14 May 1951 with Olivia de Havilland and Richard Basehart.

On 30 October 2009, as part of the celebrations for the 75th anniversary of the BBC's Maida Vale Studios, Jenny Seagrove and Nigel Havers starred in a special Radio 2 production of Brief Encounter, performed live from Maida Vale's studio 6 (MV6). The script used was a 1947 adaptation for radio by Maurice Horspool, which had been in the BBC's ownership and had never been used or performed since then. In addition, there were two Theatre Guild on the Air broadcasts of Brief Encounter in its original form, Still Life. The first version aired on 6 April 1947 over ABC with Ingrid Bergman, Sam Wanamaker and Peggy Wood. The second one was presented over NBC on 13 November 1949 and starred Helen Hayes and David Niven.

TV
A 1974 television remake of the film, shown in the US on the Hallmark Hall of Fame, starred Richard Burton and Sophia Loren, but was not well received.

Theatre
The first adaptation of Brief Encounter to source both the screenplay and Coward's original stage material was adapted by Andrew Taylor and starred Hayley Mills. The first national tour took place in 1996 and later transferred into the West End (Lyric Theatre, Shaftesbury Avenue) in 2000 starring Jenny Seagrove.

Emma Rice/Kneehigh Theatre adaptation

The Kneehigh Theatre production, produced by David Pugh and Dafydd Rogers, was adapted for the stage and directed by Emma Rice and is a mixture of the film and the stage play, with additional musical elements. It premiered at Birmingham Repertory Theatre in October 2007 and the West Yorkshire Playhouse later that month before opening in February 2008 at the Haymarket Cinema in London, which was converted into a theatre for the play. The 2008 London cast included Amanda Lawrence and Tamzin Griffin, with Tristan Sturrock and Naomi Frederick in the lead roles. The production ran until November 2008 and then toured the UK for 27 weeks from February to July 2009, with venues including the Oxford Playhouse, Marlowe Theatre and the Richmond Theatre and with the two leads played by Hannah Yelland and Milo Twomey. The US premiere at the American Conservatory Theater in San Francisco, CA ran from September to October 2009. The adaptation was performed in Brooklyn, New York at St. Ann's Warehouse in December 2009 and January 2010 and at the Guthrie Theater in Minneapolis in February–April 2010.

A Roundabout Theatre Company production of the Kneehigh adaptation opened at Studio 54 in New York City on 28 September 2010 starring Hannah Yelland, Tristan Sturrock, and other members of the London cast. The limited engagement closed on 2 January 2011, after 21 previews and 119 performances, including a four-week extension.

After an Australian tour in autumn 2013, Kneehigh's production of Brief Encounter appeared at the Wallis Annenberg Center in Beverly Hills and the Shakespeare Theater in Washington in spring 2014.

The production returned to the UK, opening at Birmingham Repertory Theatre (where the production originally premiered) and The Lowry, Salford, in February 2018 before returning to the Haymarket Cinema in London from March to September 2018.

Opera
In May 2009 Houston Grand Opera premiered the two-act opera Brief Encounter based on the film's story, with music by André Previn from a libretto by John Caird.

See also
BFI Top 100 British films
Meghamalhar

References

Sources

External links
 
 
 
 
 . Full synopsis and film stills (and clips viewable from UK libraries)
 
 

 
 

Streaming audio
 
 
 

1945 films
1945 romantic drama films
British black-and-white films
British romantic drama films
Films about infidelity
British films based on plays
Films directed by David Lean
Films produced by Noël Coward
Films produced by Anthony Havelock-Allan
Films produced by Ronald Neame
Films set in 1938
Films set in England
Palme d'Or winners
Rail transport films
Eagle-Lion Films films
Films adapted into operas
1940s English-language films
1940s British films